Gambling Apocalypse: Kaiji, known in Japan as Tobaku Mokushiroku Kaiji, is the first part of the manga series Kaiji by Nobuyuki Fukumoto. It ran in Kodansha's seinen manga magazine Weekly Young Magazine from 1996 to 1999. Kodansha collected its chapters in thirteen tankōbon volumes, released from September 6, 1996, to October 6, 1999. It was followed by the second part, Tobaku Hakairoku Kaiji. Gambling Apocalypse: Kaiji was adapted  by Madhouse into an anime television series, Kaiji: Ultimate Survivor, which was broadcast from 2007 to 2008.

In August 2018, it was announced at Otakon that the then brand new North American manga publishing company Denpa licensed the first part. It is being released in a six-volume omnibus edition with 500+ pages in each one, and the first volume was published on November 12, 2019. In June 2020, Manga Planet announced the digital English-language publication of the series. It was planned to start on June 23, 2020; however, it was postponed to November 18, 2020.


Volume list

Omnibus edition

References

Kaiji manga chapter lists